Fordham is a small village and civil parish in the English county of Norfolk.

History
Fordham's name is of Anglo-Saxon origin and derives from the Old English for a village or homestead close to a ford, likely across the River Great Ouse.

The Parish of Fordham has been the site of discovery for several significant Bronze Age artefacts, including a hammer, a decorated sword and a socketed axehead.

In the Domesday Book, Fordham is listed as a settlement of 22 households in the hundred of Clackclose. In 1086, the village was divided between the East Anglian estates of St Benedict's Abbey, Ralph Baynard, Henry de Ferrers, Reginald, son of Ivo and the Abbey of St Etheldreda, Ely.

Snore Hall dates from the Medieval period and was originally built as a timber-framed, fortified manor-house. The building that stands today was built in early sixteenth century, with extensions made in the eighteenth and twentieth centuries. The hall has a good example of a sixteenth-century priest hole, and was the site of a council convened by King Charles I during the English Civil War.

Geography
According to the 2001 Census, Fordham has a population of 71 residents living in 29 households.

Fordham falls within the constituency of South West Norfolk and is represented in Parliament by Liz Truss of the Conservative Party. For the purposes of local government, the parish falls within the district of King's Lynn and West Norfolk.

St Mary's Church

The Church of England parish church, St Mary's, is now redundant and in the care of the Friends of Friendless Churches.  The church is a Grade II* listed building. The church was largely built in the nineteenth century, with the chancel the only surviving feature from the Medieval period. The nave collapsed in the eighteenth century and the tower fell some time after.

War memorial
Fordham shares a war memorial with the nearby villages of Denver, Ryston and Bexwell. The memorial takes the form of a stone cross atop an octagonal plinth, located on Denver's village green. The memorial lists the following Fordham men who died during the First World War:
 Sgt. Harry Dungay (1887-1914), 1st Bn., Lincolnshire Regiment
 L-Cpl. Robert Dungay (d.1916), 7th Bn., Bedfordshire Regiment
 Pvt. Alfred Symonds (1891-1917), 1st Bn., Cambridgeshire Regiment
 Pvt. Frank Place (d.1916), 17th Bn., King's Regiment
 Pvt. Harold S. Tingay (d.1917), 1/8th Bn., West Yorkshire Regiment
 Pvt. James Pope (d.1918), 1/5th Bn., York and Lancaster Regiment
 H. Fuller

And, the following for the Second World War:
 Spr. Leslie Holman (1915-1943), 251st (Field Park) Coy., Royal Engineers

Further reading
 Blomefield, F. (1807). Volume VII: An essay towards a topographical history of the county of Norfolk. Oxford: Oxford University Press. (https://books.google.co.uk/books?id=GgYVAAAAQAAJ&pg=PA366&redir_esc=y#v=onepage&q&f=false), pp.366-368.

References

External links

King's Lynn and West Norfolk
Villages in Norfolk
Civil parishes in Norfolk